Videm pri Temenici is a small settlement in the Municipality of Ivančna Gorica in central Slovenia. It lies above the valley of the Temenica River in the historical region of Lower Carniola. The municipality is now included in the Central Slovenia Statistical Region.

Name
The name of the settlement was changed from Videm to Videm pri Temenici in 1953.

References

External links
Videm pri Temenici on Geopedia

Populated places in the Municipality of Ivančna Gorica